Anderson da Silva may refer to:

 Anderson da Silva (footballer, born 1975), Brazilian football defender
 Anderson da Silva (footballer, born 1980), Brazilian football midfielder
 Anderson de Silva (footballer, born 1982), Brazilian football midfielder

See also
 Anderson Silva (disambiguation)
 Anderson Soares da Silva (disambiguation)
 Sonny Anderson (born 1970), full name Anderson da Silva, Brazilian footballer striker